Rhodopina pubera is a species of beetle in the family Cerambycidae, and is the type species of its genus. It was described by James Thomson in 1857. It is known from India.

References

pubera
Beetles described in 1857